The Best of Creedence Clearwater Revival is a compilation album by American rock band Creedence Clearwater Revival, released in 1993. The album features all the tracks on Chronicle, which was released in 1976, as well as "Good Golly Miss Molly," "Born on the Bayou", "Cotton Fields," "Hello Mary Lou," "The Midnight Special," "Walk on the Water," and "Night Time Is the Right Time," which appear on the 1986 release Chronicle, Vol. 2. "Bootleg" does not appear on either volume.

Track listing

Disc One
"Proud Mary" - 3:08
"Bad Moon Rising" - 2:19
"Susie Q" - 4:35
"Up Around the Bend" - 2:42
"Run Through the Jungle" - 3:07
"Good Golly Miss Molly" - 2:42
"Someday Never Comes" - 4:00
"Commotion" - 2:42
"Who'll Stop the Rain" - 2:28
"Green River" - 2:33
"I Heard It Through the Grapevine" - 11:04
"Lodi" - 3:10
"Lookin' Out My Back Door" - 2:33
"Have You Ever Seen the Rain?" - 2:38

Disc Two
"Travelin' Band" - 2:08
"Down On The Corner" - 2:45
"Born On The Bayou" - 5:15
"Cotton Fields" - 2:56
"Hello Mary Lou" - 2:15
"The Midnight Special" - 4:11
"Walk on the Water" - 4:40
"Bootleg" - 3:02
"Hey Tonight" - 2:43
"Fortunate Son" - 2:20
"I Put A Spell On You" - 4:33
"Sweet Hitch-Hiker" - 2:56
"The Night Time Is the Right Time" - 3:08
"Long As I Can See the Light" - 3:31

Personnel
John Fogerty - Lead Guitar, Vocals
Tom Fogerty - Rhythm Guitar
Stu Cook - Bass
Doug Clifford - Drums

1993 greatest hits albums
Creedence Clearwater Revival compilation albums
Fantasy Records compilation albums
Albums produced by John Fogerty
Albums produced by Stu Cook
Albums produced by Doug Clifford
Albums produced by Saul Zaentz